The Épinal Hockey Club, known as Wildcats d'Épinal, is a French ice hockey team based in Épinal playing in the FFHG Division 1. The team was formerly known as the Dauphins d'Épinal (Épinal Dolphins), Image Club d'Épinal and Gamyo Épinal for sponsorship reasons when a French video game company, Gamyo, bought the naming rights in 2014. The team was founded in 1997 and plays home games at the Patinoire de Poissompré.

Former players

Logos

External links
 Official website 

Sport in Épinal
Ice hockey teams in France
Ice hockey clubs established in 1997
1997 establishments in France